"Grass" is a song written by Colin Moulding of the English rock band XTC, released as the lead single from their 1986 album Skylarking. It reached number 100 on the UK Singles Chart.

Background
"Grass" is sometimes mistaken to be about cannabis, but was actually written about [seven fields], a parkland in Swindon. Moulding composed it on an open E-tuned guitar and found its harmonic changes by playing the chord shapes of Thunderclap Newman's "Something in the Air" (1969). The mixing of violin and guitar was an idea lifted from John Lennon's "How Do You Sleep?" (1971). Skylarking producer Todd Rundgren added a tiple to the blend. Moulding originally sang the song with a deeper voice. He said Rundgren voiced concern that the effect was too close to "a molester", and so Moulding "did the Bowie thing and added an octave above it".

On Skylarking, the track bookends "Summer's Cauldron" with a reprise of its "insect chorus".

Personnel
XTC
 Dave Gregory
 Colin Moulding
 Andy Partridge

Charts

References

External links
 

XTC songs
1986 songs
1986 singles
Songs written by Colin Moulding
Song recordings produced by Todd Rundgren
Music videos directed by Nick Brandt